ABC Newcastle (call sign: 2NC) is an Australian radio station. It is the Newcastle station of the ABC local radio network, and is licensed to, and serving Newcastle and surrounding areas. It operates on the AM band at 1233 kilohertz. Formerly known by its callsign 2NC, the NC in the callsign is short for Newcastle, while the 2 represents the state of New South Wales. The station was established in 1930.

History
2NC was the very first regional radio station in Australia outside a capital city. It was set up by Adrian Jose.  The first broadcast occurred 19 December 1930, and played the Newcastle Symphony Orchestra playing the William Tell Overture. James Fenton acting as the prime minister of Australia gave a speech.  Local Newcastle content was limited to an hour a week and included news, market reports and church services. The station was heard in New Zealand.  Its original frequency was 1245 kHz or wavelength of 241 meters.  The power was 2 kW with a modulation of 85%.  The transmitting equipment was established by Keith Thow of STC. The transmitting antenna is at Beresfield.  It was designed to have a range of 25 miles, covering a population of 200,000.

In 1931 2YB in New Plymouth, New Zealand was interfering with 2NC causing a heterodyne whistle.

Other early local content included the Newcastle Steel Works Band, the Newcastle Choral Society and the Newcastle Revellers.

For a time in the early 2000s, the ABC Newcastle website included a 5-day-a-week 5-minute TV news bulletin dedicated to Newcastle, shot in the ABC NSW studio.

The first studios were located behind the Old Strand Theatre on Market Street, before moving to 24 Wood Street.

Programs
Its programs are also heard on ABC Upper Hunter, the ABC's station serving the Upper Hunter.

Sports coverage
In addition to Grandstand's national coverage, 1233 ABC Newcastle and ABC Upper Hunter also broadcast Newcastle Knights rugby league and Newcastle Jets football games as well.

See also
 ABC Upper Hunter

References

External links
1233 ABC Newcastle official website
A history of the ABC in Newcastle

Newcastle
Radio stations in Newcastle, New South Wales
Radio stations established in 1930